Roberto Del Castello (born 13 September 1957) is an Italian racing driver.

Racing record

Complete European Formula Two Championship results
(key) (Races in bold indicate pole position; races in italics indicate fastest lap)

Complete International Formula 3000 results
(key) (Races in bold indicate pole position; races in italics indicate fastest lap.)

References

1957 births
Living people
Italian racing drivers
European Formula Two Championship drivers
International Formula 3000 drivers
Superstars Series drivers

RC Motorsport drivers